Christopher Hinton (born 1952 in Galt, Ontario) is a Canadian film animator, film director and professor, living in Victoria, British Columbia, Canada. Hinton's films have won international awards and been twice nominated for an Academy Award for Best Animated Short Film: in 1991 for the National Film Board of Canada (NFB) animated short film Blackfly and in 2003 for his independently made short Nibbles. Hinton won a Genie Award for his 2004 short film cNote. He began freelancing for the NFB in Winnipeg in the 1970s. He has written and directed over a dozen films for The National Film Board of Canada, CBC, & Sesame Street.  Recent films, Flux (NFB,2003), cNote (NFB, 2005), Chroma Concerto (2007), and Compression (2008), explore the boundaries of narrative and abstraction and the integration of contemporary media into the moving image.  He was a full-time professor in the Animation Program at Concordia University.

Filmography
 Canada Vignettes: Lady Frances Simpson - 1978
 Blowhard - 1978, with Brad Caslor 
 Giordano - 1985
 A Nice Day in the Country - 1988
 Blackfly - 1991
 Watching TV - 1994
 Flux - 2002
 Twang - 2002
 X-Man - 2002
 Nibbles - 2003
 cNote - 2005

References

External links
Reference Library biography
Watch Hinton's films at NFB.ca

1952 births
Artists from Ontario
Canadian animated film directors
National Film Board of Canada people
Academic staff of Concordia University
Film directors from Ontario
People from Cambridge, Ontario
Living people
Directors of Genie and Canadian Screen Award winners for Best Animated Short
Animation educators
Canadian film educators